Shivalingappa Rudrappa Kanthi (1908 - 1969) was the Chief Minister of Karnataka (then, Mysore State) for a brief period in 1962. He hailed from Lingayat religion in Hungund in Bagalkot district (formerly Bijapur district) in the northern part of Karnataka. A member of the Indian National Congress (INC), he served as the Speaker of Karnataka Legislative Assembly from 1956 to 1962. Kanti was Chief Minister of the State for a brief period of 96 days in 1962.  Later, as Education Minister in the S. Nijalingappa Cabinet he was instrumental in the establishment of Bangalore University and Kittur Rani Chennamma Sainik Schools.

His centenary celebrations were held in 2008. He belonged to Banajiga sub-sect of Lingayat community.

See also
 List of chief ministers of Karnataka

References

1908 births
Year of death missing
People from Bagalkot district
Chief ministers from Indian National Congress
Indian National Congress politicians from Karnataka
Chief Ministers of Karnataka
Mysore MLAs 1952–1957
Mysore MLAs 1957–1962
Mysore MLAs 1962–1967
Mysore MLAs 1967–1972
Members of the Mysore Legislature
Bombay State MLAs 1952–1957